Mahoba is a city in Mahoba District of the Indian state of Uttar Pradesh in the Bundelkhand region, well known for the ninth century granite Sun temple built in Pratihara style. It is also well known for the 24 rock-cut Jain tirthankara image on Gokhar hill. Mahoba is known for its closeness to Khajuraho, Lavkushnagar and other historic places like Kulpahar, Charkhari, Kalinjar, Orchha, and Jhansi. The town is connected with railways and state highways.

Geography

Topography
It has an average elevation of 214 metres (702 feet).

Climate

Demographics
 India census, Mahoba has a population of 95,216 divided into 25 wards. Mahoba has an average literacy rate of 74.91%, higher than the state average of 67.68%: male literacy is 82.03%, and female literacy is 66.88% with 12.68% of the population is under 6 years of age.

Schedule Caste (SC) and Schedule Tribe (ST) constitutes 14.93% and 0.42% of the total population in Mahoba. Based on the census 75.21% of the total population are Hindus, 23.64% are Muslims and the rest is occupied by other faiths.

History
Mahoba fought in India's independence under the leadership of Bundelkhand Kesri & Bundelkhand Gandhi Dewan Shatrughan Singh and his wife the valiant freedom fighter Rani Rajendra Kumari. The Rani also defeated the sitting UP Chief Minister CB Gupta in a byelection in 1958. Dewan Saheb performed the first Gram Daan to Acharya Vinobha Bhave. It was carved out of Hamirpur district in 1995.

Tourist destinations

Tourist destinations in and around Mahoba include:
 Rahila Sagar Sun Temple
 Kakramath Temple
 Gorakhgiri Hill
 Vijay Sagar Pakshi Vihar
 Rahila Sagar
 Madan Sagar
 Arjun Sagar Dam
 Senapati Mahal
 Raja ka Tal

Notable people

 Rani Durgavati, a Chandela princess of Mahoba
 Pushpendra Singh Chandel, MP, BJP

References

External links
Mahoba District web site

 
Cities and towns in Mahoba district
Cities in Bundelkhand